A. C. Jones High School is a public high school located in Beeville, Texas (USA) and classified as a 4A school by the UIL. It is part of the Beeville Independent School District located in central Bee County. In 2015, the school was rated "Met Standard" by the Texas Education Agency.

Athletics
The A.C. Jones Trojans compete in these sports:

Baseball
Basketball
Cross Country
Football
Golf
Powerlifting
Soccer
Softball
Tennis
Track and Field
Volleyball
Wrestling

Notable alumni
Byron Bradfute, National Football League player
Edmundo Mireles Jr., FBI agent involved it the 1986 FBI Miami shootout

References

External links
 
 Beeville ISD

Public high schools in Texas
Schools in Bee County, Texas